Tyler Turner (born 26 August 1988) is a Canadian para-snowboarder who competes in the SB-LL1 category. He won the gold medal in the men's snowboard cross SB-LL1 event at the 2022 Winter Paralympics held in Beijing, China. He also won the bronze medal in the men's banked slalom SB-LL1 event.

Life and career 
Turner won the bronze medal in the men's dual banked slalom at the 2021 World Para Snow Sports Championships held in Lillehammer, Norway. He also won the silver medal in the men's snowboard cross event. Turner and Alex Massie won the gold medal in the men's team event.

Turner competed in snowboarding at the 2022 Winter Paralympics in Beijing, China.

References

External links
 

1988 births
Living people
Canadian male snowboarders
Paralympic snowboarders of Canada
Snowboarders at the 2022 Winter Paralympics
Sportspeople from Saskatoon
Medalists at the 2022 Winter Paralympics
Paralympic medalists in snowboarding
Paralympic gold medalists for Canada
Paralympic bronze medalists for Canada
20th-century Canadian people
21st-century Canadian people